Glyphipterix gaudialis is a species of sedge moth in the genus Glyphipterix. It was described by Alexey Diakonoff in 1976. It is found in Japan.

The wingspan is 11–14 mm.

References

Moths described in 1976
Glyphipterigidae
Moths of Japan